Moracin M is a phosphodiesterase-4 inhibitor isolated from Morus alba.

References

Phenols
Benzofurans